The Winner in Me is the second solo contemporary gospel album (fourth overall) by SWV member Coko.

Track listing
 Make a Way (featuring Canton Jones)
 The Joy of the Lord (featuring Israel Houghton)
 Rescue Me
 The Winner in Me
 May Be the Last Time
 Let Me Go
 Wait (featuring Youthful Praise)
 This Is Me
 Oh Mary (featuring Kelly Price)
 Just Like You
 I Surrender
 Renew My Mind (featuring Lady Tibba)

Charts

References

Coko albums
Gospel albums by American artists
2009 albums
Light Records albums